"Pon de Replay" is the debut single of Barbadian singer Rihanna, from her debut studio album Music of the Sun (2005). It was written and produced by Vada Nobles, Alisha "M'Jestie" Brooks, Carl Sturken and Evan Rogers. The song was released on May 24, 2005, as the lead single from the album. Prior to signing a six album record deal with Def Jam Recordings, "Pon de Replay" was one of three songs which was recorded for her demo tape to be sent to record labels. It is a dance-pop, dancehall and R&B song that features elements of pop and reggae. The lyrics revolve around Rihanna asking a DJ to turn the volume of her favorite songs up louder. The name means "play it again" in Bajan Creole, the language used for everyday speech in Barbados.

"Pon de Replay" received positive reviews from music critics, who praised the song's composition and its choice as the singer's debut single. The song was a commercial success, peaking at number one in New Zealand and on the US Billboard Dance Club Songs chart. It also reached number two on both the US Billboard Hot 100 chart and the UK Singles Chart, whilst achieving top five positions in eight other countries including Austria, Belgium, Denmark, and Switzerland. It was certified two times Platinum by the Recording Industry Association of America denoting shipments of over 2,000,000 copies. The song's accompanying music video was directed by Little X, and features Rihanna in a club with her friends, who ask the DJ to play their favorite song repeatedly.

Background 
Prior to signing a record deal with Def Jam Recordings, Rihanna was discovered in her home country of Barbados by American record producer Evan Rogers, who made the necessary arrangements for her to fly to New York. There, she recorded a collection of demos for a demo tape to be sent to record labels. One of the demos recorded was that of "Pon de Replay", which was written and produced by Carl Sturken, Evan Rogers and Vada Nobles in 2004. The first to respond to the demo tape was Jay-Z, who had recently been appointed as president and CEO of Def Jam Recordings, where Rihanna auditioned for him and music executive L.A. Reid, in his office. Looking back on the audition and meeting Jay-Z, Rihanna explained during an interview how she felt before walking into the room, saying: "That's when I really got nervous ... I was like: 'Oh God, he's right there, I can't look, I can't look, I can't look!' I remember being extremely quiet. I was very shy. I was cold the entire time. I had butterflies. I'm sitting across from Jay-Z. Like, Jay-Zee. I was star-struck." During the audition, Rihanna performed Whitney Houstons cover of "For the Love of You", "Pon de Replay" and "The Last Time", the latter two of which would go on to be included on her debut album, Music of the Sun. Initially, Jay-Z was skeptical about signing Rihanna, because he felt "Pon de Replay" was too big for her, saying "when a song is that big, it's hard [for a new artist] to come back from. I don't sign songs, I sign artists". "Pon de Replay" was released via iTunes on July 26, 2005, through Def Jam Recordings.

Composition 
"Pon de Replay" is a dance-pop, dancehall and R&B song that infuses a reggae style. According to the digital music sheet published at musicnotes.com, the song is written in the key of F-sharp minor and is set in common time with a moderated dance groove, with a metronome of 100 beats per minute. Rihanna's vocal range in the song spans from the low note of F♯3 to the high note of C♯5. The title of the song is in Bajan Creole, a primarily spoken language used in Barbados, and means "play it again" in English. Lyrically, the song is about asking the DJ to play the protagonist's favorite song, as well as the fulfillment of dancing in a club. Doug Rule of Metro Weekly commented on the lyric "Hey Mr. DJ, won't you turn the music up?" and that it follows in the footsteps of recent songs which also incorporated "Hey Mr. DJ", including Madonnas "Music" and Jennifer Lopezs "Play".

In an interview with Kidzworld, Rihanna explained the lyrical content of the song, saying: "It's just language that we speak in Barbados. It's broken English. Pon is on, de means the, so it's just basically telling the DJ to put my song on the replay." Jason Birchmeier of Allmusic  wrote about the song's composition and musical influences, "[Pon de Replay] is driven by booming dancehall-lite beats and a reggae vocal cadence (and title spelling), it's a simple dance-pop song at its core, with standard English-language singing as well as a can't-miss singalong hook." Barry Walters of Rolling Stone also commented on the song's composition and concurred with Birchmeier's opinions of the song, writing that the song is "a poppy piece of dancehall reggae with slapping, syncopated beats recalling big-band jazz".

Critical reception 
The song received generally positive reviews from music critics. Sal Cinquemani of Slant Magazine praised the song, and compared it to Beyoncé 2003 chart topper "Baby Boy", because of how both songs feature "a dancehall-pop mixture". Barry Walter of Rolling Stone called the song "sexy and savvy".

Chart performance 

In the United States, "Pon de Replay" debuted at number 97 on June 11, 2005, and ascended into the top 10 of the US Billboard Hot 100 chart at number nine in the issue dated July 16, 2005, and became the "Greatest Airplay Gainer" that week. In the issue dated July 30, 2005, the song peaked at number two on the Billboard Hot 100, being held off of the top spot by Mariah Carey's "We Belong Together", which spent a total of 14 non-consecutive weeks at number one. "Pon de Replay" spent a total of 12 weeks inside the top 10 of the Hot 100 and 23 weeks on the chart in total. The song also peaked at number one on the US Billboard Dance Club Songs and Digital Songs charts, number two on the US Mainstream Top 40 chart, and 24 on the US Hot R&B/Hip-Hop Songs chart. The song was also certified two times platinum by the Recording Industry Association of America on December 19, 2012, denoting shipments of over 2,000,000 copies.

In New Zealand, the song debuted at number 37 on the New Zealand Singles Chart on August 15, 2005, and peaked at number one in its ninth week on the chart, after having been locked at number two for four weeks previous. The song spent a total of seven weeks inside the top five chart positions and 16 weeks on the chart in total. In Australia, "Pon de Replay" debuted at number 13 on the Australian Singles Chart on September 25, 2005, and peaked at number six in its ninth week on the chart. The song spent a total of 10 weeks in the top 10 chart positions and 22 weeks on the chart in total and was certified platinum by the Australian Recording Industry Association, denoting shipments of over 70,000 copies.

Elsewhere, the song achieved moderate commercial success in Europe, peaking inside the top 10 of eight charts. In Switzerland, the song debuted at number eight on the Swiss Music Charts on September 11, 2005, and peaked at number three for three consecutive weeks. The song spent a total of 41 weeks on the chart. The song also debuted at number four on the Norwegian Singles Chart and peaked at number three in its fifth week; the song spent a total of 15 weeks on the chart. "Pon de Replay" also peaked inside the top five in Denmark, Austria and Sweden, peaking at numbers four, five and five, respectively. "Pon de Replay" also peaked inside the top 10 in Italy and Finland, peaking at numbers six and eight, respectively. However, the song was less successful in other territories, peaking at number 15 in The Netherlands and number 18 in France and Spain, respectively. In the United Kingdom, "Pon de Replay" debuted and peaked at number two on the UK Singles Chart on September 3, 2005. The song stayed at the number two position for a further week, and stayed inside the top 10 for four weeks.

Music video 
The music video for "Pon de Replay" was directed by Little X. The video was filmed in Toronto, Canada at Republik Nightclub and is set in a nightclub and begins with Rihanna and two of her friends arriving at a nightclub where the atmosphere appears lackluster; due to the low volume of the music (referencing the song's lyrics), the people in the club seem bored and not dancing. Subsequently, Rihanna vows to make the DJ turn up the music, thus stepping up onto a platform, wearing a gold belly top with baggy jeans, beginning to perform to the song, causing the DJ, played by Cipha Sounds, to turn the music up. With this, the people still bored now begin dancing to Rihanna's track, including Canadian rapper Kardinal Offishall, who also makes a cameo appearance. Scenes of people dancing in the club are shown, with intercut shots being juxtaposed of Rihanna leaning against a wall with the word "Bar" in LED lights (which is actually part of a Parking sign outside of the window). She dons a pastel blue short dress, singing to the lyrics of the song. Rihanna can be seen belly-dancing on the stage, with neon green laserlights transmit above her. After Rihanna gets the crowd moving, she runs off of the platform onto a dance floor, where the crowd later join her. The video's final scenes show the people in the club all gathered on the middle of the dance floor, choreographing different dance moves. These include a line of people featuring Rihanna, and male dancers who make a bicycle from their bodies.

Live performances
"Pon De Replay" was the opening song on the set list of Rihanna's 2007–09 Good Girl Gone Bad Tour, her first world tour. The singer's performance in Manchester was released in the United Kingdom through iTunes, and is featured on the Good Girl Gone Bad Live DVD. Rihanna performed "Pon de Replay" complete with flags of Barbados and colorful carnival attire at the 2005 MTV Video Music Awards pre-show in Miami on August 28, 2005. Rihanna has performed the song at the Macy's Thanksgiving Day Parade in November 2005.

Track listings and formats 

Digital download
 "Pon de Replay" (radio edit) – 3:34

European CD single
 "Pon de Replay" (radio edit) – 3:34
 "Pon de Replay" (remix) (featuring Elephant Man) – 3:37

UK maxi CD single
 "Pon de Replay" (radio edit) – 3:34
 "Should I?" (featuring J-Status) – 3:06
 "Pon de Replay" (Cotto's Replay Dub) – 6:48
 "Pon de Replay" (U-MYX Remix Software)

Australian and European maxi CD single
 "Pon de Replay" (radio edit) – 3:34
 "Pon de Replay" (Cotto's Replay Dub) – 6:48
 "Pon de Replay" (instrumental) – 4:06
 "Pon de Replay" (music video) – 3:37

Digital download (Dance Remixes)
 "Pon de Replay" (Pon De Club Play) – 7:32
 "Pon de Replay" (Cotto's Replay Dub) – 6:47

Accolades

Charts

Weekly charts

Year-end charts

Certifications

Release history

See also 
 List of number-one dance singles of 2005 (U.S.)

References

External links 
 

2005 songs
2005 debut singles
Dancehall songs
Music videos directed by Director X
Number-one singles in New Zealand
Rihanna songs
Songs about dancing
Songs written by Carl Sturken and Evan Rogers
Songs written by Vada Nobles
Def Jam Recordings singles
Songs about music